This is a list of hotels in Malta.


Note: not full a list

Former hotels 
Grand Hotel, Valletta
Jerma Palace Hotel, Marsaskala (closed 2007)
Marfa Palace Hotel, Mellieħa
Selmun Palace Hotel, Mellieħa (closed 2011)

See also 

 Lists of hotels – an index of hotel list articles on Wikipedia

External links 
 Hotels - visitmalta.com

References 

Hotels
Malta